New Colony is an unincorporated community in Bell County, in the U.S. state of Texas. According to the Handbook of Texas, only 4 people lived in the community in 2000. It is located within the Killeen-Temple-Fort Hood metropolitan area.

History
In 1905, Czech settlers from Taylor and Elgin settled in the area, which included the Jezek, Jirasev, Shiller, Dusek, and Shenkir families. The Vine Shiller farm was the site of a meeting to organize the first Slavonic Benevolent Order of the State of Texas (SPJST) fraternal lodge in January 1907. The community surrounding the lodge chose the name New Colony, or Nova Osada. John and Francis Shenkir donated an acre of land for the first hall to be built in 1908 and had only one room. The Leedale Extension Homemakers Club built a community center in New Colony in the 1950s and served as a hub of local gatherings and events, as well as the home of SPJST lodge 69. The fraternity ended in December 1971. Only 4 people lived in the community from 1990 through 2000 and continued to be listed on county maps.

Geography

Education
The community's first school opened in 1909 and was named the "Blue School" because its exterior was painted blue. It had three classrooms in the early 1920s. It was shown on county maps in the 1930s and continued to serve children in the area into the next decade. It then joined the Rogers Independent School District during that time. The school is now commemorated with a Texas State Historical Marker, which was placed in 1995. Today, the community continues to be served by the Rogers ISD.

References

Czech communities in the United States
Unincorporated communities in Texas
Unincorporated communities in Bell County, Texas